Tropical Storm Debby was the fifth tropical storm of the 2006 Atlantic hurricane season. Debby formed just off the coast of Africa on August 21 from a tropical wave. After passing near the Cape Verde islands, Debby moved generally northwestward for much of its life, reaching a peak intensity of 50 mph (85 km/h). Strong wind shear weakened the storm, and Debby dissipated on August 27 over the northern Atlantic Ocean.

Early in its life, Debby was forecast to pass through the southern Cape Verde islands as a tropical storm, potentially causing life-threatening flooding. Most computer models consistently predicted Debby to track to the northwest throughout its lifetime, though intensity was more problematic for forecasters. The National Hurricane Center continually predicted Debby to intensify to hurricane status, though strong vertical shear ultimately prevented the storm from becoming a hurricane.

Meteorological history

A vigorous tropical wave moved off the coast of Africa late on August 20, and almost immediately developed convective banding and a broad circulation. A broad area of low pressure formed within the wave the next day while located 260 mi (420 km) southeast of the Cape Verde islands. Though convection decreased early on August 21, the area of low pressure remained well-organized and the system developed into Tropical Depression Four late on August 21. Water temperatures remained warm enough for development, while upper-level shear was minimal as the depression moved west-northwestward due to a ridge of high pressure to its north. Initial predictions by the National Hurricane Center also forecast a motion to the northwest based on consistent model predictions, though, as quoted by forecaster James Franklin, "The models have also been excellently wrong thus far".

Despite a decrease in convection shortly after forming, the large depression remained well organized, with a wind field 575 mi (930 km) in diameter. On August 22, as it passed 140 mi (225 km) to south of the Cape Verde islands, deep convection developed over the center of circulation, and early on August 23 the depression intensified into Tropical Storm Debby about 300 mi (485 km) southwest of Cape Verde. Banding features continued to organize as the system slowly strengthened, and on August 23 Debby attained a peak intensity of 50 mph (85 km/h) over the open waters of the Atlantic Ocean. Forecasters predicted Debby to continue to intensify to attain hurricane status, while its projected path placed the storm in an area of warm water temperatures and moderate upper-level shear.

Shortly after reaching its peak intensity, Debby encountered an area of dry air, and subsequently weakened. The low level circulation detached itself from the diminishing convection while the system as a whole continued west-northwestward. Convection redeveloped over a portion of the center, while banding features redeveloped as well. Organization continued, and Debby again reached its peak intensity of 50 mph (85 km/h) on August 24. Southerly wind shear displaced the convection to the north of the center, and Debby weakened to a minimal tropical storm on August 25. The center of the storm became asymmetric and elongated, and on August 26 Debby weakened to a tropical depression. Convection remained minimal and it quickly degenerated into a remnant area of low pressure. The low turned to the north and north-northeast ahead of an approaching trough, and on August 28 the low dissipated.

Preparation and Impact
The government of the Cape Verde islands issued a tropical storm warning coinciding with the issuance of the first advisory on Tropical Depression Four, meaning tropical storm conditions were expected in the area within 24 hours. The National Hurricane Center stated that heavy rainfall, potentially as high as 10 in (250 mm) in mountainous areas, would be possible in the territory, possibly causing life-threatening flash floods and mudslides. However, due to a reformation further to the south, tropical storm warnings were discontinued as the depression moved from the area. While passing around 115 mi (185 km) to the southwest of the southwesternmost islands, the depression produced a 35 mph (55 km/h) wind gust at Fogo and some rainfall, though no damage was reported.

Long range forecasts brought the storm near Bermuda. However Debby remained over 900 mi (1,450 km) from the island at its closest approach. Though the storm was forecast to remain far away from the Gulf of Mexico, investors tracking the storm caused the price of crude oil to rise 60 cents a barrel due to the potential impact to oil installations.

See also

 Other storms of the same name

References

External links

 National Hurricane Center's archive on Tropical Storm Debby
 

2006 Atlantic hurricane season
Atlantic tropical storms
Hurricanes in Cape Verde
Debby